Cochem (before 7 June 2009 Cochem-Land) is a Verbandsgemeinde ("collective municipality") in the district Cochem-Zell, in Rhineland-Palatinate, Germany. It is located around the town Cochem (also part of the Verbandsgemeinde since 7 June 2009), which is the seat of the Verbandsgemeinde. On 1 July 2014 it was expanded with 6 municipalities from the former Verbandsgemeinde Treis-Karden. Since the 1 March 2018 Wolfgang Lambertz is the mayor of the Verbandsgemeinde Cochem.

Cochem consists of the following Ortsgemeinden ("local municipalities"):

{|
|valign=top|
 Beilstein 
 Bremm 
 Briedern 
 Bruttig-Fankel 
 Cochem1, 2
 Dohr 
 Ediger-Eller 
 Ellenz-Poltersdorf 
 Ernst 
 Faid 
 Greimersburg 
 Klotten 
|valign=top|
 Lieg 
 Lütz 
 Mesenich 
 Moselkern 
 Müden (Mosel) 
 Nehren 
 Pommern 
 Senheim 
 Treis-Karden
 Valwig 
 Wirfus 
|}

Verbandsgemeinde in Rhineland-Palatinate